Dudley "Red" Garrett (July 24, 1924 – November 24, 1944) was a Canadian professional ice hockey defenceman who played 23 games for the New York Rangers of the National Hockey League in the 1942–43 season.

Dudley was born in Toronto, Ontario. He went to school at (now known as)  Hodgson Senior Public school.  Garrett originally was property of the Toronto Maple Leafs, however he was traded in 1942 along with Hank Goldup to the Rangers for future Hart Trophy recipient, Babe Pratt. Garrett was killed in action during World War II while serving on the corvette , during a convoy escort mission off the coast of Channel-Port aux Basques, Newfoundland in the Battle of the St. Lawrence. The American Hockey League presented a trophy in his honour in 1947, the Dudley "Red" Garrett Memorial Award, which is given to the best rookie in the AHL each season.

See also
List of ice hockey players who died during their playing career
Toronto Maple Leafs

References

External links

Memorial Site maintained by Dudley's family

1924 births
1944 deaths
Canadian ice hockey defencemen
Canadian military personnel killed in World War II
Ice hockey people from Toronto
Military personnel from Toronto
New York Rangers players
People from Old Toronto
Providence Reds players
Royal Canadian Navy officers
Royal Canadian Navy personnel of World War II
Toronto Marlboros players